The 1996–97 NBA season was the 29th season for the Seattle SuperSonics in the National Basketball Association. The SuperSonics entered the season as runners-up in the 1996 NBA Finals, having lost to the Chicago Bulls in six games. During the off-season, the team signed free agents Jim McIlvaine, Craig Ehlo, and Larry Stewart, and then later on signed Terry Cummings in January. Coming off their trip to the NBA Finals, the Sonics remained as one of the elite teams in the Western Conference posting an 11-game winning streak after losing two of their first three games. They later on posted a nine-game winning streak in January, then won seven straight games in February, and held a 32–15 record at the All-Star break. The Sonics won their third Division title in four years with a 57–25 record, and entered the playoffs as the #2 seed in the Western Conference. The SuperSonics had the sixth best team defensive rating in the NBA.

Three members of the team, Gary Payton, Shawn Kemp and Detlef Schrempf were all selected for the 1997 NBA All-Star Game. Payton averaged 21.8 points, 7.1 assists and 2.4 steals per game, and was named to the All-NBA Second Team, and NBA All-Defensive First Team, while Kemp averaged 18.7 points, 10.0 rebounds and 1.5 steals per game, and Schrempf provided the team with 16.8 points, 6.5 rebounds and 4.4 assists per game, but only played 61 games due to a foot injury. In addition, Hersey Hawkins contributed 13.9 points and 1.9 steals per game, while off the bench, sixth man Sam Perkins provided with 11.0 points per game, Cummings averaged 8.2 points and 4.1 rebounds per game in 45 games, and McIlvaine led the team with 2.0 blocks per game. Defensive guard Nate McMillan only played just 37 games this season due to a torn right abductor muscle. Payton also finished in sixth place in Most Valuable Player voting, and in second place in Defensive Player of the Year voting.

In the Western Conference First Round of the playoffs, the Sonics trailed 2–1 to the 7th-seeded Phoenix Suns, but won the series in five games. In the Western Conference Semi-finals, they faced the Houston Rockets, who had home court advantage in the series, and took a 3–1 series lead. The Sonics won the next two games to even the series, but lost Game 7 to the Rockets.

This season was Kemp's final season with the SuperSonics, as he was traded to the Cleveland Cavaliers in a three-team trade the following year. Also following the season, Cummings signed as a free agent with the Philadelphia 76ers, while Stewart was released to free agency, and Ehlo retired.

Draft picks

Roster

Regular season

Season standings

Record vs. opponents

Game log

Playoffs

|- align="center" bgcolor="#ffcccc"
| 1
| April 25
| Phoenix
| L 101–106
| Gary Payton (23)
| Shawn Kemp (15)
| Gary Payton (9)
| KeyArena17,072
| 0–1
|- align="center" bgcolor="#ccffcc"
| 2
| April 27
| Phoenix
| W 122–78
| Payton, Kemp (23)
| Shawn Kemp (15)
| Gary Payton (6)
| KeyArena17,072
| 1–1
|- align="center" bgcolor="#ffcccc"
| 3
| April 29
| @ Phoenix
| L 103–110
| Gary Payton (34)
| Shawn Kemp (11)
| Gary Payton (6)
| America West Arena19,023
| 1–2
|- align="center" bgcolor="#ccffcc"
| 4
| May 1
| @ Phoenix
| W 122–115 (OT)
| Gary Payton (28)
| Shawn Kemp (20)
| Gary Payton (14)
| America West Arena19,023
| 2–2
|- align="center" bgcolor="#ccffcc"
| 5
| May 3
| Phoenix
| W 116–92
| Detlef Schrempf (24)
| Shawn Kemp (11)
| Gary Payton (10)
| KeyArena17,072
| 3–2
|-

|- align="center" bgcolor="#ffcccc"
| 1
| May 5
| @ Houston
| L 102–112
| Shawn Kemp (24)
| Shawn Kemp (11)
| Eric Snow (7)
| The Summit16,285
| 0–1
|- align="center" bgcolor="#ccffcc"
| 2
| May 7
| @ Houston
| W 106–101
| Shawn Kemp (22)
| Shawn Kemp (15)
| Gary Payton (9)
| The Summit16,285
| 1–1
|- align="center" bgcolor="#ffcccc"
| 3
| May 9
| Houston
| L 93–97
| Payton, Kemp (28)
| Shawn Kemp (10)
| Payton, Kemp (5)
| KeyArena17,072
| 1–2
|- align="center" bgcolor="#ffcccc"
| 4
| May 11
| Houston
| L 106–110 (OT)
| Gary Payton (27)
| Kemp, Cummings (9)
| Gary Payton (11)
| KeyArena17,072
| 1–3
|- align="center" bgcolor="#ccffcc"
| 5
| May 13
| @ Houston
| W 100–94
| Hersey Hawkins (23)
| Shawn Kemp (10)
| Gary Payton (11)
| The Summit16,285
| 2–3
|- align="center" bgcolor="#ccffcc"
| 6
| May 15
| Houston
| W 99–96
| Shawn Kemp (22)
| Shawn Kemp (11)
| Gary Payton (13)
| KeyArena17,072
| 3–3
|- align="center" bgcolor="#ffcccc"
| 7
| May 17
| @ Houston
| L 91–96
| Gary Payton (27)
| Shawn Kemp (10)
| Gary Payton (7)
| The Summit16,285
| 3–4
|-

Player statistics

NOTE: Please write the players statistics in alphabetical order by last name.

Season

Playoffs

Awards and records

Awards
 Gary Payton, All-NBA Second Team
 Gary Payton, NBA All-Defensive First Team

Records

Transactions

Trades

Free agents

Additions

Subtractions

References

See also
 1996–97 NBA season

Seattle SuperSonics seasons